Mal Lewis Jones is a British children's author.

Background 

She was born in Kidderminster, England and attended a private school before moving to Kidderminster High School for Girls at eleven. She continued her education at Warwick University, where she read English and American Literature. Her tutors were Germaine Greer, Harold Beaver and Bernard Bergonzi.

Lewis Jones' main titles concern Cassie at the Ballet School. The books are published by Hodder Children's Books and by Ravensburger in Germany. There have been many "bind-ups" of the stories where two stories are contained in one edition. The covers of the original books show Sophie Bould and Jessie Jones. Sophie Bould starred alongside Connie Fisher in The Sound of Music.

Lewis Jones has published other dance books including the six titles in the Dance Club series, published by McDonald Young books.

She has also adapted The Wind in the Willows by Kenneth Grahame, for Hodder and WHSmith.

Her strange and mysterious story, The Grey Pony is published by Orion.

Mal Lewis Jones is also well known for the series of educational books published by Heinemann, about Frisky the Lamb. These have been very successful and widely used in UK schools and elsewhere.

She is also joint co-collator of the classic poetry anthology, Good Night, Sleep Tight which is a collection of 366 poems, one for every night of the year. It is published by Scholastic and in America by Scholastic Inc.

She lives in Shropshire with her husband, Ivan Jones. Their daughter was the illustrator (of Poppy Cat Books and numerous others) Lara Jones, who died aged 34, in 2010.

Titles of books
Cassie at the Ballet School;  for books published by Kindle
Ghost at the Ballet School;
New Friends at the Ballet School;
Trouble at the Ballet School;
On Tour with the Ballet School;
Stars of the Ballet School.

Lewis Jones has also written and published many poems in anthologies.

References 

The Cambridge Guide to Women's Writing in English (Cambridge University Press 1999. Editor Lorna Sage)

Year of birth missing (living people)
Living people
English children's writers
People from Kidderminster